Duban may refer to:
 Duban (character), a character from the One Thousand and One Nights folk tale
 Duban (crater), a crater on Saturn's moon Enceladus
 Duban, Iran, a village in Fars Province, Iran
 Félix Duban (1798 - 1870), a French architect

See also
 Durban